James Leslie Read (26 December 1943 – 10 October 2020) was an Australian rules footballer who played for St Kilda in the Victorian Football League (VFL).

He cowardly king hit Essendon player Barry Davis at Moorabin breaking his jaw. His son Darren Read is a legend.

References

External links

Australian rules footballers from Victoria (Australia)
1943 births
St Kilda Football Club players
St Kilda Football Club Premiership players
One-time VFL/AFL Premiership players

2020 deaths